Eudonia mesoleuca is a moth of the family Crambidae. It is endemic to the Hawaiian island of Oahu.

The larvae have been reared from dead branches.

References

External links

Eudonia
Endemic moths of Hawaii
Moths described in 1888